Wang Jian; c. 1598–1677 was a Chinese landscape painter during the Ming dynasty (1368–1644) and Qing dynasty (1636–1912).

Wang was born in Taicang in the Jiangsu province. His style name was Xuanzhao and his pseudonyms were 'Xiangbi' and 'Ranxiang anzhu'. Wang's precise color style of painting was influenced by Dong Yuan. His own works stand out, and he is a member of the Four Wangs and Six Masters of the early Qing period.

Notes

References
 Ci hai bian ji wei yuan hui. Ci hai. Shanghai: Shanghai ci shu chu ban she, 1979.

External links
Landscapes Clear and Radiant: The Art of Wang Hui (1632-1717), an exhibition catalog from The Metropolitan Museum of Art (fully available online as PDF), which contains material on Wang Jian (see index)

1598 births
1677 deaths
Qing dynasty landscape painters
Qing dynasty politicians from Jiangsu
Painters from Suzhou
Politicians from Suzhou
Ming dynasty landscape painters
People from Taicang